Temporal sulcus may refer to:

 Inferior temporal sulcus
 Superior temporal sulcus